Hiram Evans Booth (October 25, 1860 – July 9, 1940) was a Utah State Senator and United States Attorney.

Biography
Hiram Booth was born near Postville, Iowa on October 25, 1860.

A Liberal and then a Republican, Booth was active in Utah politics for decades. He served in the last Utah Territorial Assembly in 1894, and was a senator in the 1st Utah State Legislature from 1895 to 1897. He was United States Attorney for Utah for two terms, beginning in 1906.

Personal life
He married Carrie M. Robinson on August 26, 1886 and they had one daughter. However, his wife died in December 1887. He remarried, to Lillian B. Redhead, on May 29, 1889, and they had two children.

He died in Los Angeles on July 9, 1940.

References

1860 births
1940 deaths
United States Attorneys for the District of Utah
Utah state senators
People from Postville, Iowa